1574 Meyer, provisional designation , is a carbonaceous asteroid from the outer region of the asteroid belt, approximately 59 kilometers in diameter. It was discovered on 22 March 1949, by French astronomer Louis Boyer at Algiers Observatory in Algeria, northern Africa. It was named after French astronomer M. Georges Meyer.

Orbit and classification 

The C-type asteroid orbits the Sun in the outer main-belt at a distance of 3.4–3.7 AU once every 6 years and 8 months (2,429 days). It is a member of the Cybele group, with an orbital eccentricity of 0.04 and an inclination of 14° with respect to the ecliptic. On 10 September 1998, Meyer occulted PPM 172432.

Lightcurve 

In March 2009, a rotational lightcurve of Meyer was obtained from photometric observations by Landry Carbo at the Oakley Southern Sky Observatory in Australia. The lightcurve analysis gave a rotation period of 12.64 hours with a brightness variation of 0.12 magnitude.

Diameter and albedo 

According to the space-based surveys carried out by the Japanese Akari satellite and NASA's Wide-field Infrared Survey Explorer with its subsequent NEOWISE mission, Meyer measures between 57.78 and 69.97 kilometers in diameter, and its surface has an albedo between 0.027 and 0.042. The Collaborative Asteroid Lightcurve Link derives an albedo of 0.0559 and calculates a diameter of 58.88 kilometers with an absolute magnitude of 9.9.

Naming 

This minor planet was named for French astronomer M. Georges Meyer (born 1894), director of the discovering Algiers Observatory. The official  was published by the Minor Planet Center in November 1952.

References

External links 
 European asteroidal occultation observations for (1574) Meyer 
 Asteroid Lightcurve Database (LCDB), query form (info )
 Dictionary of Minor Planet Names, Google books
 Asteroids and comets rotation curves, CdR – Observatoire de Genève, Raoul Behrend
 Discovery Circumstances: Numbered Minor Planets (1)-(5000) – Minor Planet Center
 
 

001574
Discoveries by Louis Boyer (astronomer)
Named minor planets
19490322